Lisa C. Shapiro (born 1967) is an American and Canadian philosopher and  Professor of Philosophy at Simon Fraser University. She is known for her expertise on early modern philosophy.

Books
 Pleasure: A History (ed.), Oxford University Press, 2018
 Emotion and Cognitive Life in Medieval and Early Modern Philosophy, edited with Martin Pickavé, Oxford University Press, 2012
 The correspondence between Elisabeth, Princess of Bohemia and Descartes, University of Chicago Press, 2007

References

External links
 Personal Website
 Lisa Shapiro at SFU

21st-century American philosophers
Philosophy academics
Living people
1967 births
American women philosophers
Canadian women philosophers
Descartes scholars
Hume scholars
Spinoza scholars
Academic staff of Simon Fraser University
University of Pittsburgh alumni
Wesleyan University alumni
21st-century American women